Ehsan Alvanzadeh is an Iranian football forward who currently plays for Iranian football club Fajr Sepasi in the Azadegan League.

Club career

Alvanzadeh was a part of Esteghlal Khuzestan U21 during 2012–14. He was promoted to first team in Summer 2013 by Abdollah Veisi. He netted in his debut match against Rah Ahan on October 17, 2013. In summer 2014 he joined Naft Masjed Soleyman with a 2-year contract.

FC Persepolis 
On 7 June 2016 he joined FC Persepolis with a 3-year contract.

Club career statistics

Honours
Persepolis
Persian Gulf Pro League (2): 2016–17, 2017–18
Iranian Super Cup (2): 2017, 2018
AFC Champions League runner-up: 2018

Fajr Sepasi
Azadegan League: 2020–21

References

External links
 Ehsan Alvanzadeh at PersianLeague.com
 Ehsan Alvanzadeh at IranLeague.ir

1995 births
Living people
Iranian footballers
People from Dezful
Esteghlal Khuzestan players
Naft Masjed Soleyman F.C. players
Persepolis F.C. players
Association football forwards
Machine Sazi F.C. players
Sportspeople from Khuzestan province